"Birthday Song, Requiem" is a collaboration maxi single containing songs sung by former I've Sound singer Lia. It was first released on December 28, 2002 at Comiket 63 in Japan by Key Sounds Label bearing the catalog number KSLA-0007. The single contains one disc with three tracks composed, arranged, and produced by Jun Maeda, Magome Togoshi, Ryō Okabe, and Fishtone. The cover art features a passage from Mark 16:6-7 from the American Standard Version of the Bible.

Track listing

References

External links
Key Sounds Label's official website 

2002 singles
Key Sounds Label
Lia (singer) songs
2002 songs